Talla Diaw (born 21 August 1954) is a Senegalese wrestler. He competed in the men's freestyle 52 kg at the 1984 Summer Olympics.

References

1954 births
Living people
Senegalese male sport wrestlers
Olympic wrestlers of Senegal
Wrestlers at the 1984 Summer Olympics
Place of birth missing (living people)